Guðbjartur Hannesson (3 June 1950 – 23 October 2015) was an Icelandic politician and was welfare minister. He was affiliated with the Social Democratic Alliance (Samfylkingin).

He won a seat in parliament for the Social Democratic Alliance in 2007. He served as speaker of the Althing in 2009. In September 2010 he was appointed Minister for Social Affairs and Health and was charged with merging his department with the Ministry of Labour and create a new Ministry for Welfare from January 2011.

After the parliamentary election 27 April 2013 there was a change of government and on 23 May Eygló Harðardóttir became the new welfare minister, while Kristjáni Þór Júlíussyni became minister of Health. He died on 23 October 2015 after a very short battle with cancer.

References 

1950 births
2015 deaths
Gudbjartur Hannessons
Gudbjartur Hannessons
Gudbjartur Hannesson
Gudbjartur Hannesson
Gudbjartur Hannessons
Gudbjartur Hannesson
Gudbjartur Hannessons